M. Mellor was an English footballer who played for Stoke.

Career
Mellor played for Leek before joining Stoke in 1883. He played in the club's first competitive match in the FA Cup which Stoke lost 2–1 to Manchester. He was released at the end of the 1883–84 season by manager Walter Cox.

Career statistics

References

Year of birth missing
Year of death missing
Footballers from Stoke-on-Trent
English footballers
Association football defenders
Leek F.C. players
Stoke City F.C. players